Rugby union in Norway is a minor but growing sport.

For a number of years, Norway was perhaps the most northerly country playing the sport, and boasted the world's most northerly rugby club, Oslo RFC, which was founded in 1964.

Governing body
The Norwegian Union was founded in 1982, and joined the IRFB in 1993.

History
Norway was the last of the three Scandinavian countries to take up rugby. However, amongst the Nordic countries, it is by no means the weakest, Norway are good against smaller teams but are not very good under pressure but still play well. 
as it is a more recent introduction to Finland, and has no presence in the other three nations. A major problem though, is the climate, which means that many pitches may be under snow for large parts of the year. Serious interest in the game began in the 1960s.

For many years, Oslo RFC was the most northerly rugby club in the world. Stavanger Rugby Club was formed in 1978 and played Oslo in the Autumn of that year, presenting Oslo with a trophy, a rockbit, in 1979, a return match was played in Stavanger; Oslo won both matches.. During the mid-1980s, Oslo RFC's nearest opposition in Norway was Stavanger, a round trip of 685 miles. Their nearest club was Karlstad RFC in Sweden a round trip of 310 miles.

Rugby has a much longer standing in neighbouring Sweden and Denmark, 
which have a combined figure of around 10,000 registered players, and it has been introduced there. Rugby union is also played in neighbouring
Shetland, and visitors from there have toured Norway, including people from the British military bases and ships there.

Norway played its first international against Latvia who beat them 44–6. At the time, the Welsh fly-half Huw Howells was the driving force in trying to promote the game.

Notable players
 Erik Lund, Leeds Carnegie, Biarritz and captain of Norway
 Magnus Lund, brother of Erik, Sale Sharks, Biarritz and England
 Anton Smith-Petersen, Harlequin F.C.

See also 
 Norway national rugby union team

External links
 Archives du Rugby: Norvege

References

 Cotton, Fran (Ed.) (1984) The Book of Rugby Disasters & Bizarre Records. Compiled by Chris Rhys. London. Century Publishing. 
 Richards, Huw A Game for Hooligans: The History of Rugby Union (Mainstream Publishing, Edinburgh, 2007) 
 "Rugby" on Store norske leksikon